The Purple Heart is a 1944 American black-and-white war film, produced by Darryl F. Zanuck, directed by Lewis Milestone, and starring Dana Andrews, Richard Conte, Don "Red" Barry, Sam Levene and Trudy Marshall. Eighteen-year-old Farley Granger had a supporting role.

The film is a dramatization of the  "show trial" of a number of US airmen by the Japanese government during World War II. It is loosely based on the trial of eight US airmen who took part in the April 18, 1942, Doolittle Raid on Japan. Three of the eight were subsequently executed and one later died as a POW. This film was the first to deal directly with the Japanese treatment of POWs and ran into opposition from the US War Department, which was afraid that such films would provoke reprisals from the Japanese government.

Plot
In April 1942, after a raid on Japan, eight American aircrew made up of the crews from two North American B-25 Mitchell bombers, are captured. Capt. Harvey Ross (Dana Andrews), becomes the leader of the captives. Initially, the men are picked up by a local government official who is a Chinese collaborator in a Wang Jingwei controlled section of China. The collaborator delivers the Americans to the Imperial Japanese Army to be put on trial at the Shanghai Police Headquarters. Although international observers and correspondents are allowed to witness the trial, the commanding officer, General Mitsubi (Richard Loo) refuses to allow Karl Kappel (Torben Meyer), the Swiss Consul to contact Washington.

At the start of the trial, Lt. Greenbaum (Sam Levene), an attorney in civilian life (CCNY Law 1939), declares the trial is illegal, as the men are in the military service of their country. When the senior officer Captain Ross refuses to answer the demands of the sly General Mitsubi to reveal the location of their aircraft carrier, the general decides to break the men. The airmen endure harsh interrogation and torture from the Japanese guards with Sgt. Jan Skvoznik (Kevin O'Shea) left in a catatonic state with a permanent head twitch. In court, the men see the pitiful state of Skvoznik. Lts. Canelli (Richard Conte) and Vincent (Don "Red" Barry) rush the Japanese general, quickly felled by rifle butts and are returned to their cell. Canelli, an artist, suffers a broken right hand and arm. Vincent ends up in a catatonic state much like Skvoznik. Sgt. Clinton (Farley Granger) returns seemingly unharmed, but the Japanese have ruptured his vocal cords, and he is unable to speak. The Japanese have a listening device in the cell when Greenbaum (Sam Levene) repeats what the speechless Clinton writes. If anything happens to Lt. Bayforth (Charles Russell), he will tell all. After being tortured, Bayforth returns with his hands and arms useless, covered in black rubber gloves.

In the face of his captives' unshakable resolve and the realization that the Japanese are doomed to destruction, the sadistic General Mitsubi ultimately chooses to shoot himself. The systematic torture and abuse the airmen endured while in captivity, and the final injustice of being tried, convicted and executed as war criminals is unveiled to the world.

Cast 

 Dana Andrews as Capt. Harvey Ross
 Richard Conte as Lt. Angelo Canelli
 Farley Granger as Sgt. Howard Clinton 
 Kevin O'Shea as Sgt. Jan Skvoznik
 Don 'Red' Barry as Lt. Peter Vincent (credited as Donald Barry)
 Trudy Marshall as Mrs. Ross
 Sam Levene as Lt. Wayne Greenbaum
 Charles Russell as Lt. Kenneth Bayforth
 John Craven as Sgt. Martin Stoner
 Tala Birell as Johanna Hartwig
 Richard Loo as Gen Mitsubi
 Peter Chong as Mitsuru Toyama
 Gregory Gaye as Peter Voroshevski, Russian News Correspondent
 Torben Meyer as Karl Kappel, the Swiss Consul
 Kurt Katch as Ludwig Kruger, German News Correspondent

Production

Principal photography for The Purple Heart began on October 11, 1943 and continued to mid-January 1944. Zanuck and a team of writers endeavoured to ensure that the story was based on documentation and unofficial collaboration of the torture suffered by the prisoners, and "... should be almost documentary in its honesty ..." The United States Office of War Information (OWI) reviewed the script and was able to suggest some changes to strengthen the role of the Chinese civilians who had helped the Doolittle Raiders.

The Purple Heart was a work of wartime propaganda that had  a stereotypical portrayal of the Japanese (usually by actors of non-Japanese origin) as sadistic tyrants trying to wrest the secret of their aircraft carrier's location during torture sessions. The 16 air crews did arrive over Japan from the USS Hornet (CV-8). President Franklin D. Roosevelt said the crews came from Shangri-La, a fictional place described in the 1933 novel Lost Horizon by British author James Hilton. The USS Shangri-La (CV-38) was commissioned in 1944.

The Purple Heart  was based on the real-life story of eight Doolittle Raiders who were captured from two different crews: Lieutenants Dean E. Hallmark, Robert J. Meder, Chase Nielsen, William G. Farrow, Robert L. Hite and George Barr, and Corporals Harold A. Spatz and Jacob DeShazer. Three Doolittle Raiders (Farrow, Hallmark and Spatz) were executed by the Imperial Japanese Army, while Meder died of disease in prison. In September 1945, after the Japanese surrender, the four survivors of the trial were repatriated back to the U.S. While three became regular civilians, Doolittle Raider Jacob DeShazer would return to Japan to be a minister.

The Purple Heart concludes with a speech where Dana Andrews as Capt. Harvey Ross declares that he had understood the Japanese less than he had thought, and that they did not know Americans if they thought this would frighten them.

At the time of its release, the war in the Pacific was still raging and there was little concern for such excesses. The December 7, 1941, Japanese attack on Pearl Harbor was still fresh in the minds of the American public. In later years, many of the principal players, including Dana Andrews, came to express regret over the more distasteful aspects of the film.

Reception
Released during the war, The Purple Heart inspired theatre patrons to purchase thousands of dollars of War Bonds, and opened to good reviews. The review in Variety reflected the times; "... an intensely moving piece, spellbinding, though gory at times, gripping and suspenseful for the most part." Bosley Crowther, the film reviewer of The New York Times, cautiously endorsed the film's patriotic message. "... an overpowering testimonial it is, too—a splendid tribute to the bravery of young men who have maintained their honor and dignity despite the brutal tortures of the Japanese; and a shocking and debasing indictment of the methods which our enemies have used. Americans cannot help but view this picture with a sense of burning outrage—and hearts full of pride and admiration for our men who have so finely fought and died." Harrison's Reports wrote, "A powerful drama, it grips one throughout." David Lardner of The New Yorker called "impressive" the "sheer imagination called for" to make a film about an event that happened in a country at a time when it could not be filmed on location. He also praised the performances of the leads as "convincing". However, he identified a drawback in that the film's events were overly "squeezed into too small a confinement of space and time" in order to serve dramatic purposes.

References

Notes

Citations

Bibliography

 Dower. John W. War Without Mercy: Race & Power in the Pacific War . New York: Pantheon Books, 1987. .
 Koppes, Clayton R. and Gregory D. Black. Hollywood Goes to War: How Politics, Profits and Propaganda Shaped World War II Movies. New York, The Free Press, 1987. .

External links
 
 
 
 

1944 films
1944 war films
American World War II propaganda films
1940s English-language films
American black-and-white films
World War II films based on actual events
World War II aviation films
Films about shot-down aviators
World War II prisoner of war films
Pacific War films
Films about the Doolittle Raid
Films about capital punishment
Films about the United States Army Air Forces
20th Century Fox films
Films directed by Lewis Milestone
Films produced by Darryl F. Zanuck
Films scored by Alfred Newman
Films set in 1942
American war films